Turris semipustulosa is an extinct species of sea snail, a marine gastropod mollusk in the family Turridae, the turrids.

Distribution
This extinct marine species was found in Oligocene strata in Aquitaine, France

References

 Lozouet (P.), 2017 - Les Conoidea de l’Oligocène supérieur (Chattien) du bassin de l’Adour (Sud-Ouest de la France). Cossmanniana, t. 19, p. 1-179, fig. 1-16 (publié le 20 décembre)

semipustulosa
Gastropods described in 2017
Oligocene gastropods